Kendrell Alexander Bell (born July 2, 1980) is a former American football linebacker. He played college football at Georgia and was drafted by the Pittsburgh Steelers in the second round of the 2001 NFL Draft, where he was named NFL Defensive Rookie of the Year. Bell later played for the Kansas City Chiefs before retiring following the 2007 season.

High school career
Bell attended Lucy Craft Laney High School in Augusta, Georgia. He was a three-sport star in football, basketball, and track & field. In football, he was an All-State selection and won Atlanta Journal All-South honors. In track & field, he was ranked fifth in the state in the shot put as a senior.

Collegiate career

Junior college years
Bell attended Middle Georgia Junior College for two years. He was a two-time Super Prep JUCO 100 selection. As a freshman, he played  fullback and finished the season with 689 rushing yards. As a sophomore, he garnered six sacks and 132 tackles, and helped lead his defensive unit to a No.1 ranking in the nation.

NCAA college years
Bell attended the University of Georgia and was a Child and Family Development Major and a letterman in football. In football, he finished his career with 153 tackles (10 for a loss), four interceptions, seven sacks, five forced fumbles, and two fumble recoveries.

Professional career

Pittsburgh Steelers
Bell started in all 16 games for the Steelers during his 2001 rookie campaign.  He was an excellent fit for the Steelers defense, notably due to his blitzing abilities.  The Steelers finished the '01 regular season with a 13-3 record, earning them the top seed in the AFC.  Bell was voted the AP NFL Defensive Rookie of the Year.  The Steelers defeated the Baltimore Ravens 27-10 in the AFC Divisional round at Heinz Field.  The following week they went on to face the second seeded New England Patriots.  Bell recorded 8 tackles, a sack, and 2 passes defended.  Despite his stellar performance, and a late 4th quarter comeback, the Steelers wound up losing the game 24-17.  In 2002, Bell was injured in week 1 of the AFCCG rematch versus New England.  He missed the next 4 games, but returned in week 7 to face the Indianapolis Colts on Monday Night.  He finished the season with 50 tackles, (33 less from his rookie year), and 4 sacks.  The Steelers finished with a 10-5-1 record, and went on to face the Cleveland Browns.  In an epic 36-33 comeback win over the Browns, Bell recorded 9 tackles but injured his knee in the final quarter and was listed as doubtful for the following week at Tennessee.  Although hurt, Bell started the game against the second seeded Titans.  He recorded only 2 tackles before leaving the game once again with an injury.  The Steelers lost 34-31 in a controversial finish.  In 2003, Bell amassed 99 tackles and 5 sacks despite the Steelers poor 6-10 finish.  In 2004, Bell injured his knee yet again, and would not see the field until week 9.  He played 3 games for the Steelers before he re-injured his knee in week 11 versus Cincinnati.  In the 2005 off-season, the Steelers, (who went 15-1 in the regular season without Bell), released him from the team.

Kansas City Chiefs
He then signed with the Kansas City Chiefs, where he played 3 seasons. Bell was released following the 2007 season, after which he retired.

References

1980 births
Living people
Players of American football from Augusta, Georgia
American football outside linebackers
Georgia Bulldogs football players
Pittsburgh Steelers players
Kansas City Chiefs players
American Conference Pro Bowl players
National Football League Defensive Rookie of the Year Award winners